is a town located in Onga District, Fukuoka Prefecture, Japan.

, the town has an estimated population of 32,109 and a density of 660 persons per km². The total area is 48.51 km².

The town is known within the region for its production of the loquat fruit. Its town mascots are two loquat characters named Biwarin and Biwasuke.

Notable sights in the town include Budo No Ki, a venue featuring several restaurants and popular for weddings, as well as the Ashiya cycling road on Hatsu beach. A popular, well-established sushi restaurant called Sushi Yatai operates from a refurbished train car located along the main beach area.

References

External links

Okagaki official website 

Towns in Fukuoka Prefecture